Filatima revisensis is a moth of the family Gelechiidae. It is found in the United States, where it has been recorded from Illinois, Iowa and Minnesota.

The larvae feed on Amorpha canescens. They feed inside shelters constructed of silked-together leaflets. The species overwinters in the larval stage.

Etymology
The species is named for the Revis Hill Prairie in Mason County, Illinois, the type locality.

References

Moths described in 2013
Filatima